The Anglican Diocese of Evo is one of ten within the Anglican Province of the Niger Delta, itself one of 14 provinces within the Church of Nigeria. The current bishop is Innocent Ordu. Ordo was consecrated a bishop on July 12, 2009 at St Peter's, Yenagoa and the diocese was inaugurated the next day at All Saints' Cathedral, Rumuokwurusi.

Notes

Church of Nigeria dioceses
Dioceses of the Province of Niger Delta